Bojarski (feminine: Bojarska; plural: Bojarscy) is a Polish-language surname.

People 

Janusz Bojarski (born 1956), officer of the Polish Armed Forces
Marcin Bojarski (born 1977), Polish writer
Wacław Bojarski (1921–1944), Polish poet
Roxanne Bojarski, fictional character on American Dreams

Polish-language surnames